The 2022 Women's Masters Basel was held from September 23 to 25 at the Curlingzentrum Region Basel in Arlesheim, Switzerland as part of the World Curling Tour. The event was held in a round-robin format with a purse of 32,000 CHF. It was the first women's World Curling Tour event of the 2022–23 curling season.

Teams
The teams are listed as follows:

Round robin standings 
Final Round Robin Standings

Round robin results
All draw times listed in Central European Time (UTC+01:00).

Draw 1
Friday, September 23, 9:00 am

Draw 2
Friday, September 23, 12:00 pm

Draw 3
Friday, September 23, 3:30 pm

Draw 4
Friday, September 23, 7:00 pm

Draw 5
Saturday, September 24, 9:00 am

Draw 6
Saturday, September 24, 12:00 pm

Draw 7
Saturday, September 24, 3:30 pm

Draw 8
Saturday, September 24, 7:00 pm

Playoffs

Source:

Quarterfinals
Sunday, September 25, 8:00 am

Semifinals
Sunday, September 25, 11:15 am

Final
Sunday, September 25, 2:30 pm

Notes

References

External links
Official Website
CurlingZone

2022 in women's curling
Women's curling competitions in Switzerland
Sports competitions in Basel
2022 in Swiss sport
September 2022 sports events in Switzerland
21st century in Basel
Arlesheim
2022 in Swiss women's sport